Boobyalla was a shipping port on the north-east coast of  Tasmania, Australia during the latter half of the nineteenth century. Coastal vessels ran regularly to the port from other Tasmanian ports, carting tin from the mines around nearby Mount Cameron.

Boobyalla Post Office opened on 29 July 1875 and closed in 1927.

Fauna 
The Boobyalla River, on which the port used to sit, is now a possible habitat for the rare fish species dwarf galaxid and Australian grayling, as well as the Green and Gold Frog Litoria raniformis.

Boobyalla today 
Little remains of Boobyalla, now a ghost town, as buildings such as the old hotel and houses were either burned down by bushfires or dismantled. Remnants of the old wharf are still visible at the edge of the silted-up Boobyalla River. A single property now owns the whole site with the main house located at the end of former Hurst Street.

References

Mining towns in Tasmania
Ghost towns in Tasmania
North East Tasmania
Towns in Tasmania
Localities of Dorset Council (Australia)